Otto Honkaheimo (born August 3, 1985) is a Finnish ice hockey defenceman who currently plays professionally in Finland for Lukko of the SM-liiga. He currently is the captain for Lukko, succeeding Erik Hämäläinen.

Career statistics

References

External links

Living people
FoPS players
HIFK players
Hokki players
KalPa players
Kiekko-Vantaa players
Lempäälän Kisa players
Lukko players
Peliitat Heinola players
Stjernen Hockey players
Vaasan Sport players
1985 births
Finnish ice hockey defencemen
People from Rauma, Finland
Sportspeople from Satakunta
21st-century Finnish people